Petrosia is a genus of sponges belonging to the family Petrosiidae.  Petrosia are well distributed from temperate zone waters to tropical and from intertidal zone to deep waters.

The genus has almost cosmopolitan distribution.

Species

Species:

Petrosia alfiani 
Petrosia armata 
Petrosia australis

References

Sponges